Paul Bilbo (born October 15, 1991), better known by his ring name Pretty Boy Smooth or P. B. Smooth, is an American professional wrestler and actor. He currently competes on the independent wrestling circuit for promotions that have include Absolute Intense Wrestling, Game Changer Wrestling, RYSE Wrestling, Enjoy Wrestling, Beyond Wrestling, Invictus Pro Wrestling, and Maryland Championship Wrestling. He has also appeared with the national promotion All Elite Wrestling.

Early life and education 
Born in Hempstead, New York, Bilbo started at St. Dominic High School in Oyster Bay, New York, where he helped lead the Bayhawk team to a 52–24 record in his last three seasons. Bilbo played Division I basketball at Hofstra University with former future Golden State Warriors 2011 second round draft pick, Charles Jenkins. Bilbo finished his collegiate career at Division II college Mercyhurst University He received a bachelor's degree in communications and a master's degree in organizational leadership.

Professional wrestling career 
Smooth began training as a professional wrestler for Pro Wrestling Rampage in Erie, PA under head trainer Aaron Draven. When the school closed, he trained under WWE's Johnny Gargano at the Absolute Intense Wrestling School in Cleveland, Ohio, then later with AEW's The Blade at Grapplers Anonymous in Buffalo, NY. Smooth’s official professional wrestling debut was March 13, 2016.

Smooth has become a mainstay at AIW and won several titles on the independent wrestling circuit, including an eight-month AIW tag team title run with Hornswoggle, and a victory over Tracy Williams for the AIW Absolute Championship, a victory over Wardlow of All Elite Wrestling Revenge Heavyweight Championship, and more recently winning the RYSE Grand Championship with a win over 6 competitors in one night, including Colin Delaney.

Professional wrestling style and personas 
Smooth wrestles a "powerhouse" style known for delivering powerful blows and slamming opponents from incredible heights. Formerly known under the monikers “Seven Foot Savage” and “Mr. Fresh 2 Death,” Smooth now exclusively uses the nickname, “The Urban Playboy,” as his character development has evolved into a ladies man with metrosexual attributes. His former finishing move was the "Funeral Service", but now uses an inverted Death Valley driver variation he calls “The Player’s Club".

"The ETHER" (stylized all caps) is another character layer created by Smooth. The ETHER is the unhinged ego of Pretty Boy Smooth that’s focus is on violence & destruction making it the most dangerous form of Smooth to date. The latest display of The ETHER in ring was Smooth’s match that took place on Sept 25th, 2022 at the Ohio Wrestling Alliance vs Ashton Starr, who had previously beat him in singles competition.

Filmography

Personal life 
Smooth lives in Erie, Pennsylvania.

In 2020, Smooth founded the PB Provides Scholarship Fund which is awarded yearly to an African American student who is interested in obtaining a communications degree at Mercyhurst University.

Championships and accomplishments 

RYSE Wrestling
RYSE Wrestling Grand Champion

Absolute Intense Wrestling
AIW Absolute Championship
AIW Future Cup (2017)
AIW Tag Team Championship (1 time) – with Hornswoggle

Pro Wrestling Illustrated
Ranked No. 409 of the top 500 singles wrestlers in the PWI 500 in 2022
Ranked No. 262 of the top 500 singles wrestlers in the PWI 500 in 2021
Ranked No. 377 of the top 500 singles wrestlers in the PWI 500 in 2020
Ranked No. 379 of the top 500 singles wrestlers in the PWI 500 in 2019

Pro Wrestling Rampage
Pro Wrestling Rampage Tag Team Titles (1 time) – with Colby Redd

Revenge Pro Wrestling
Revenge Heavyweight Championship

References

External links 
 
 
 

Living people
American male professional wrestlers
African-American male professional wrestlers
1991 births
People from Hempstead (town), New York
Professional wrestlers from Pennsylvania
Actors from Erie, Pennsylvania
Sportspeople from Erie, Pennsylvania